The Return of Jimmy Valentine is a 1936 American crime film directed by Lewis D. Collins and written by Olive Cooper and Jack Natteford. The film stars Roger Pryor, Charlotte Henry, Robert Warwick, James P. Burtis, Edgar Kennedy and J. Carrol Naish. The film was released on February 22, 1936, by Republic Pictures.

Plot

Cast
Roger Pryor as Gary Howard
Charlotte Henry as Midge Davis
Robert Warwick as Jimmy Davis
James P. Burtis as Mac
Edgar Kennedy as Callahan
J. Carrol Naish as Tony Scapelli
Lois Wilson as Mary Davis
Charles C. Wilson as Kelley
Wade Boteler as Red Dolan
Gayne Whitman as Radio Actor
Dewey Robinson as Augie Miller
Hooper Atchley as Rocco
William P. Carleton as Warden Keeley
Frank Melton as Dixon

References

External links
 

1936 films
1930s English-language films
American crime films
1936 crime films
Republic Pictures films
Films directed by Lewis D. Collins
American black-and-white films
1930s American films